Ctenoplusia albostriata, the eastern streaked plusia, is a moth of the family Noctuidae. It is found in India, Sri Lanka, eastern Asia and the Pacific, including Borneo, Hong Kong, Vietnam, Japan, most of Australia and New Zealand.

Description
The wingspan is about 30–42 mm. Palpi with short third joint. Hind femur of male not tufted with long hair. Head and thorax and forewings are full brown with a grey tinge. Sub-basal, antemedial and postmedial waved lines are brownish and indistinct. Orbicular narrow, elongate and brownish with white edges. There is a white streak found on median nervure conjoined to a brown streak with pale edges on vein 2, terminating at the postmedial line. A dark dentate submarginal line present. Hindwings fuscous with pale base.

Its caterpillars are green pseudo-loopers. Body with sparse hairs and white tips. After last instar, it pupate in a loose cocoon in a curled up leaf.

The larvae feed on various plants, including Conyza bonariensis and several other Asteraceae species, as well as Dichrostachys cinerea. Other recorded food plants include Erigeron, Symphytum, Calystegia, Elephantopus, Calendula, Callistephus, Dahlia, Solidago, Aster, Abelia, Dichrocephala and Polygonum.

References

External links
Australian Faunal Directory
Caterpillar Hostplants Database (as Agrapha albostriata)
Pheromones and Semiochemicals of Ctenoplusia albostriata

Plusiinae
Fauna of Hong Kong
Moths of Australia
Moths described in 1853
Moths of Japan
Moths of New Zealand
Moths of Asia